The Canada Soccer National Development Centre and Canada Soccer EXCEL programs are full-time women's soccer development programs run by the Canadian Soccer Association in partnership with the various provincial associations to develop Canadian women's soccer players as part of the Canadian women's soccer pathway. There are three National Development Centres in Ontario, Quebec, and British Columbia and Regional EXCEL programs in Alberta, Saskatchewan, Manitoba, New Brunswick and Nova Scotia.

The three National Development Centres enter teams in Canada's tier 3 women's leagues: League1 Ontario, League1 British Columbia, and the Première ligue de soccer du Québec.

NDC Ontario

The Canadian Soccer Association partnered with the Ontario Soccer Association, Own the Podium, Sport Canada, the Canadian Sport Institute Ontario, and Bill Crothers Secondary School in Markham Ontario, to launch its Regional EXCEL (REX) program in January 2018. The REX Super Centres provide top youth female players with a centralized, daily training program to develop their skills for players from U14 to U18 as part of Canada Soccer's Long-Term Player Development (LTPD) program. 

In 2022, it was announced that the NDC Ontario program would join and enter a team in the League1 Ontario women's division. Their debut match occurred on May 22, finishing in a 1–1 draw against the Woodbridge Strikers. After finishing in second place in the regular season standings, NDC were crowned champions after defeating Alliance United FC in the playoff final in their debut season.

Seasons

NDC British Columbia (Whitecaps Academy REX)

In 2015, the Canadian Soccer Association partnered with the BC Soccer Association and the Vancouver Whitecaps FC to launch its regional EXCEL program which will be run as part of the Whitecaps FC Academy.

In 2021, it was announced that the program would join the semi-professional League1 British Columbia as a founding franchise for the 2022 season. Their home games will take place at Ken Woods Field at the National Soccer Development Centre. They played their debut match on May 22, defeating the Victoria Highlanders 5-1. During the regular season, the Whitecaps managed to finish second in the regular season standings and qualified for the Championship final, despite many of their university age players having to depart the team before the end of the season, leaving them with a roster composed of 14-17 year old players. In the Championship Final, the Whitecaps Girls defeated Varsity FC to win the inaugural women's League1 British Columbia title.

Seasons

PEF Quebec

In 2021, the Canadian Soccer Association in partnership with Soccer Quebec set up the Programme EXCEL féminin in Quebec.

In 2022, it was announced that they would field a team in the Première ligue de soccer du Québec women's division beginning in the 2022 season.

Seasons

References

NDC Ontario
Vancouver Whitecaps FC Girls Elite
PEF Québec
Canadian Soccer Association